Gérard Cornu (born 6 February 1952) is a member of the Senate of France. He represents the Eure-et-Loir department, and is a member of the Union for a Popular Movement.

References
Page on the Senate website

1952 births
Living people
French Senators of the Fifth Republic
Union for a Popular Movement politicians
Senators of Eure-et-Loir
Deputies of Eure-et-Loir
Mayors of Eure-et-Loir